The 2018 edition of UNTV Cup Executive Face Off was the 3rd off-season tournament (2nd off-season tagged as "Executive Face Off") of the annual charity basketball league in the Philippines, UNTV Cup. The tournament is organized by UNTV-37 Foundation, Inc., thru its chairman and chief executive officer of BMPI-UNTV, Kuya Daniel Razon, more popularly known as Mr. Public Service.

It officially opened on May 6, 2018 at the Pasig City Sports Complex, Pasig, with eight teams vying for the championship title. Regular games were held at the same venue with a live telecast on UNTV channel every Sunday afternoon.

The finals game was held on July 30, 2018 at the Smart Araneta Coliseum. It was between the Season 5 champions and unbeaten PNP Responders, and first time finalists Ombudsman Graft Busters. PNP dominated Ombudsman, 81–53, to get the championship, finish the off-season undefeated (9-0), and donate ₱1 million to their chosen charity.

From Season 1 to Season 6, including the three off season tournaments, UNTV Cup has given a total of ₱35 million to the beneficiaries of the participating teams.

Teams
There were 8 squads who vied for the championship title of the off-season. Senior players from 40 years old and up are eligible to participate in the competition. All participants are returning teams from UNTV Cup Season 6, including all 4 previous regular season champions, led by the defending Executive Face Off 2017 winner AFP Cavaliers.

Elimination round
The off season officially opened on May 6, 2018 at the Pasig City Sports Complex, Pasig, with eight teams vying for the championship title. Regular games were held at the same venue with a live telecast on UNTV channel every Sunday afternoon.

Playoffs

Semifinals 
The semifinals series were held on July 15, 2018 at the Pasig City Sports Center in Pasig. The two recent regular season champions face off as the Season 5 winners, undefeated, and twice-to-beat PNP Responders go up against Season 6 champions Senate Sentinels. On the other side of the bracket, Executive Face Off first-timer Ombudsman Graft Busters hold the second twice-to-beat advantage versus the two-time regular season winner Judiciary Magis.

(1) PNP Responders vs. (4) Senate Sentinels

(2) Ombudsman Graft Busters vs. (3) Judiciary Magis

Exhibition Game: UNTV Cup selection teams 
Before the much-awaited championship match between PNP Responders and Ombudsman Graft Busters, an exhibition game that served as the off-season All-Star game was held, with two squads composed of exceptional players from non-finalist teams. The winning team received ₱100,000 to be given to their chosen charity, and the losing team got ₱50,000 for their beneficiary.

The NCRPO Fitness Team and Daryl Ong performed before the exhibition game started.

Team A selection
Team A selection is composed of the players listed below. They wore their white team jerseys.
 #1 Midas Marquez (Judiciary Magis)
 #2 Sonny Angara (Senate Sentinels)
 #10 Leopoldo Casio Jr. (GSIS Thunder Furies)
 #14 Alexander Suarez (DOJ Justice Boosters)
 #16 Dion Rex Africa (DOJ Justice Boosters)
 #24 Wendell Ramiterre (Judiciary Magis)
 #33 Romel Curiba (GSIS Thunder Furies)
 #34 Kiram Grajo (AFP Cavaliers)
 #44 Joey Flaminiano (Senate Sentinels)
 #90 Elpidio Talja (AFP Cavaliers)
Head Coach: Noli Mejos (DOJ Justice Boosters)

Team B selection
Team B selection is composed of the players listed below. They wore their colored team jerseys.
 #3 Joel Villanueva (Senate Sentinels)
 #4 Reynold Munsayac (DOJ Justice Boosters)
 #8 Victor Bayani (AFP Cavaliers)
 #8 Romeo De Luna Jr. (GSIS Thunder Furies)
 #10 Raul Villanueva (Judiciary Magis)
 #14 Manuel Gerard Tomacruz (Judiciary Magis)
 #17 Nonilon Tagalicud (DOJ Justice Boosters)
 #19 Homer Alinsug (Senate Sentinels)
 #26 Rico Abarintos (GSIS Thunder Furies)
 #99 Julius Cesar Paulo (AFP Cavaliers)
Head Coach: Raffy Gonzales (Malacañang-PSC Kamao)

Result

Executive Face-off Finals: (1) PNP Responders vs. (2) Ombudsman Graft Busters 
The finals game was held on July 30, 2018 at the Smart Araneta Coliseum. It was between the Season 5 champions and unbeaten PNP Responders, and first time finalists Ombudsman Graft Busters. PNP dominated Ombudsman, 81–53, to get the championship, finish the off-season undefeated (9-0), and donate ₱1 million to their chosen charity.

Before the game, UNTV Cup founder Daniel Razon and Members Church of God International overall servant Bro. Eli Soriano gave heartfelt thanks and inspirational speeches to all the teams, organizers and fans who were part of the off-season tournament.

Performers provided entertainment which energized the audience. Bugoy Drilon sang before the start of the game. Wish 107.5 product Wishful 5 and hip hop group Ex Battalion performed during the half time break.

Winners and beneficiaries

In total, the prize pool this season was 2 million and 350 thousand pesos (₱2,350,000). The ₱1 million top prize went to the charity of the champion team. The charity of the runner-up got ₱500,000, third ₱250,000, and ₱200,000 to the fourth placers. The beneficiaries of the remaining participants received ₱100,000.

Individual awards

Most Valuable Player
On July 30, 2018, during the awarding of trophy to the champion, PSupt. Joel De Mesa of the PNP Responders was hailed as the Most Valuable Player of the season.

Top players of the season
The following players have excelled in their respective categories.

Players of the Week
The following players were named the Players of the Week.

Cumulative standings and head to head results

Elimination rounds

Playoffs

UNTV Cup Segments

Heart of a Champion
The Heart of a Champion segment features UNTV Cup players and their lives off the court as public servants.

Top Plays
The following segment features the top plays of the week and elimination round.

Player and fan interviews
UNTV Cup Executive Face Off players and fans share their thoughts in interviews.

See also
 UNTV Cup

References

External links 
 UNTVweb.com

Members Church of God International
2018 Philippine television series debuts
2018 in Philippine sport
UNTV Cup
UNTV (Philippines) original programming